Berberis weberbaueri is a shrub in the Berberidaceae described as a species in 1908. It is endemic to Peru, found in the regions of Ancash, Cajamarca, La Libertad, and Lambayeque.

The species is listed as endangered.

References

weberbaueri
Endemic flora of Peru
Plants described in 1908
Endangered plants